Robert Rößler (1 March 1838 – 20 May 1883) was a German poet.

Rößler was born in  Großburg, Lower Silesia, Prussia and died in Ratibor, where he had worked as a teacher.

Publications 
 Der Tag von Lundby (1865)
 Aus  Krieg und Frieden (1867)
 Aus der Güntherstadt (1873, Co-author)
 Dore (1876)
 Närr’sche Kerle (1878)
 Schläs’sche Durfgeschichten (1879)
 Durf- und Stoadtleute (1880)
 Wie der Schnoabel gewaxen (1881)
 Gemittliche Geschichten (1882)
 Mein erster Patient, Berlin (1883)

References

1838 births
1883 deaths
People from Strzelin County
People from the Province of Silesia
German poets
German male poets
19th-century poets
19th-century German writers
19th-century German male writers